The prime minister of Antigua and Barbuda is the head of government of the Antigua and Barbuda. The prime minister of Antigua and Barbuda is appointed by the Governor-General under the terms of the Constitution.

Appointment and tenure 
The Constitution of Antigua and Barbuda regulates that the prime minister must be a member of the House of Representatives who is the leader in the House of the political party that has the support of the majority of members of the House of Representatives. If there is no party that has an undisputed leader, or no party that maintains the support of the majority of the House of Representatives, the Governor-General may appoint a member that is most likely to maintain the support of the majority of the members, and who is willing to hold the role of prime minister.

If a prime minister must be appointed while Parliament is dissolved, then, a person who was a member of the House of Representatives immediately before the dissolution may be appointed as Prime Minister.

Responsibilities 
The prime minister advises the Governor-General on appointments to the Cabinet of Antigua and Barbuda.

Chief minister of Antigua (1960–1967)

Elizabeth II (1960–1967)

Premiers of Antigua (1967–1981)

Elizabeth II (1967–1981)

Prime ministers of Antigua and Barbuda (1981–present)

Elizabeth II (1981–2022)

Charles III (2022–present)

References

See also
 Prime Ministers of Queen Elizabeth II
 Prime Ministers of King Charles III
 List of Commonwealth Heads of Government
 Politics of Antigua and Barbuda
 Prime Minister of the West Indies Federation
 Governor-General of Antigua and Barbuda
 List of Privy Counsellors (1952–2022)

Antigua and Barbuda, Prime Ministers
 
Prime Minister
1981 establishments in Antigua and Barbuda
Antigua and Barbuda politics-related lists